Saint Andrew commonly refers to Andrew the Apostle, the Christian apostle and brother of Peter, but may also refer to:

Saint Andrew Stratelates, d. 300
Saint Andrew Corsini (San Andrea Corsini), d. 1373
Saint Andrew of Constantinople, Orthodox Fool for Christ
Saint Andrew of Crete (c. 650 – c. 730), 8th century bishop, theologian, homilist and hymnographer
Saint Andrew of Crete (martyr), a martyr
Saint Andrew of Lampsacus, d. 250 AD, martyred with Paul, Denise, and Peter
Saint Andrew Dũng-Lạc, Vietnamese martyr
also Andrew Thong Kim Nguyen, Andrew Trong Van Tram, and Andrew Tuong of the Vietnamese Martyrs
Saint Andrew Kim Taegon of the Korean Martyrs
Saint Andrew the Scot
Saint Andrew Avellino
Saint Andrew Bobola, Polish jesuit, missionary and martyr

Andrew